Skulyabinsky is a rural locality (a khutor) in Tryokhlozhinskoye Rural Settlement, Alexeyevsky District, Volgograd Oblast, Russia. The population was 138 as of 2010.

Geography 
Skulyabinsky is located 51 km south of Alexeyevskaya (the district's administrative centre) by road. Olkhovsky is the nearest rural locality.

References 

Rural localities in Alexeyevsky District, Volgograd Oblast